Tony Perez is an American film and television actor. Perez was born in Portsmouth, Virginia. He is best known for portraying Officer Mike Perez on Hill Street Blues from 1981 to 1985.

Perez also appeared in Lou Grant, CHiPs, The Golden Girls, L.A. Law, General Hospital, The Larry Sanders Show, NYPD Blue (S04E16), Six Feet Under, Sons of Anarchy, 24, and ''Once Upon a Time.

Filmography

References

External links

Living people
Year of birth missing (living people)
American male film actors
American male television actors
20th-century American male actors
People from Portsmouth, Virginia
Male actors from Virginia